Ramona Marquez (born 24 February 2001) is an English actress best known for her childhood role as Karen Brockman in the BBC One sitcom Outnumbered.

Career
In 2009, Marquez appeared as Imogen Pollock in the made-for-television movie Enid, detailing the life of children's writer Enid Blyton.

Later in 2009, Marquez became the first child to win the British Comedy Award for 'Best Female Comedy Newcomer'. Outnumbered also won two other comedy awards on the night, including 'Best TV Comedy'. Marquez has also appeared in The King's Speech as Princess Margaret and Arthur Christmas as the voice of Gwen.

Her father is Martin Marquez, an actor best known on television for his role as Gino Primirola, the head barman in the British television comedy drama Hotel Babylon. Her brother Raoul Marquez appeared with her in The Best Exotic Marigold Hotel.

Personal life
Marquez came out as bisexual in her contribution to the book Women Don't Owe You Pretty by Florence Given, released in June 2020.

Filmography

Film

Television

Music videos

Awards

References

External links

 

2001 births
Living people
21st-century English actresses
English people of Spanish descent
English television actresses
English voice actresses
English child actresses
Actresses from London
Bisexual actresses
English LGBT actors